Krishnaji Keshav Damle  (October 7, 1866 - November 7, 1905)  was a Marathi poet from Malgund , Ratnagiri Maharashtra, India, who wrote poetry under the pen name Keshavasuta or Keshavsut कृष.

Legacy 

Keshavsut's poem Tutari is seen in the soundtrack of the Oscar-nominated film Harishchandrachi Factory. On 22 May 2017, the Dadar-Sawantwadi Rajya Rani Express was named as "Tutari Express" to mark the centenary of Damle's famed poem titled "Tutari".

References

Marathi-language writers
Marathi-language poets
Indian male poets
1866 births
1905 deaths
19th-century Indian poets
Poets from Maharashtra
19th-century Indian male writers